Frank von Behren (born 28 September 1976 in Hille) is a retired German team handball player.

Club career
Von Behren played professionally for GWD Minden (1996–2003), VfL Gummersbach (2003–2006), SG Flensburg-Handewitt (2006–2008) and again Minden (2008). He reached the EHF Champions League final in 2007 with Flensburg.

Sustaining a broken thumb on top of a severe shoulder injury, von Behren ended his playing career on 1 August 2008.

International career
On 10 March 1998 von Behren made his international debut for Germany in a match against Sweden in Ellwangen. Until 2008, he played 167 games for the national team, scoring 356 goals.

He received a silver medal at the 2004 Summer Olympics in Athens. Prior to that, he had received a silver medal at the 2002 European championship.

Personal life
Von Behren is married and has three children. In 2008 he started studying sport management in Oldenburg.
Von Behren worked as a pundit for Eurosport's German language coverage of the EHF Champions League. As of the 2014–15 season he does the same job for Sky Deutschland.

References

1976 births
Living people
German male handball players
Olympic handball players of Germany
Handball players at the 2000 Summer Olympics
Handball players at the 2004 Summer Olympics
Olympic silver medalists for Germany
Olympic medalists in handball
Medalists at the 2004 Summer Olympics
Sportspeople from Detmold (region)
People from Minden-Lübbecke